Cnephasia chrysantheana is a species of moth of the  family Tortricidae. It is found in the Near East, Spain, France, Italy, Austria, the Czech Republic, Slovakia, Slovenia, Hungary, Romania, Ukraine and on Sicily and Sardinia.

The wingspan is 17–26 mm. Adults have been recorded on wing from June to July in one generation per year.

The larvae feed on Lathyrus, Scabiosa, Artemisia, Chrysanthemum, Cirsium, Carlina, Centaurea, Taraxacum and Pulmonaria species.

References

Moths described in 1842
chrysantheana